Junín Partido is a county (partido) in the . Its population is 88,664 inhabitants and the population density reaches 39.4 inhabitants/km2. Its administrative seat is the city of Junín.

Geography

It is bounded on the northwest by General Arenales, on the northeast by Rojas, on the east by Chacabuco, on the southeast by Bragado, on the south by General Viamonte, on the southwest by Lincoln and on the west by Leandro N. Alem.

Settlements
Junín
Agustina
Blandengues
Balneario Laguna de Gómez (AKA: Laguna de Gómez)
Agustín Roca (AKA: Coronel Marcos Paz)
Fortín Tiburcio
La Agraria
La Oriental
Laplacette
Las Parvas
Morse
Saforcada

Notes and references

External links
 
  Municipality of Junín - Official website.

 
Partidos of Buenos Aires Province
1881 establishments in Argentina